Triumphant Return is the third album from the Christian metal band Whitecross, released on January 31, 1989. It reached No. 13 on Billboard's Top Contemporary Christian Albums chart. The album won the 1990 Dove Award for Hard Music Album of the Year.

Track listing
 "Attention Please" (3:55)
 "Red Light" (4:34)
 "Straight Through the Heart" (3:58)
 "Down" (4:04)
 "Behold" (4:36)
 "Shakedown" (4:18)
 "Flashpoint" (1:00)
 "Simple Man" (4:32)
 "Over the Top" (4:19)
 "Heaven's Calling Tonight" (4:16)

Band members
 Scott Wenzel - vocals
 Rex Carroll - guitars
 Rick Armstrong - bass
 Mike Elliot - drums

References

1989 albums
Whitecross albums